Jazmín Álvarez is a Colombian street skateboarder. She competed at the 2022 South American Games in the roller sports competition, being awarded the bronze medal in the women's street event.

References 

Living people
Place of birth missing (living people)
Colombian skateboarders
Competitors at the 2022 South American Games
South American Games medalists in roller sports
South American Games bronze medalists for Colombia
1999 births
21st-century Colombian women